Best of the West Rides Again is a compilation recording by the Western band Riders in the Sky in 1989.

This is the second compilation taken from the Rounder albums presented by Riders in the Sky.

Track listing
 "Three on the Trail" – 1:57
 "Back in the Saddle Again" (Gene Autry, Ray Whitley) – 2:14
 "Cool Water" (Bob Nolan) – 3:23
 "Desperado Trail" – 2:54
 "At the End of the Rainbow Trail" (Douglas Green) – 2:09
 "Down the Trail to San Antone" (Spriggins) – 1:54
 "Blue Shadows on the Trail" (Daniel, Lange) – 3:40
 "(I've Got Spurs That) Jingle Jangle Jingle" (Lilley, Frank Loesser) – 2:35
 "Pecos Bill" (Daniel, Lange, Nolan, Smith) – 2:22
 "Streets of Laredo (The Cowboy's Lament)" (Traditional) – 3:07
 "West Texas Cowboy" – 3:01
 "Cowpoke" (Jones) – 1:38
 "Old El Paso" (Green) – 2:13
 "Skyball Paint" – 1:29
 "Compadres in the Old Sierra Madre" – 3:09
 "Bound to Hit the Trail" – 2:16
 "Ojo Caliente" – 3:09
 "The Yodel Blues" (Dolan, Mercer) – 2:28
 "Pretty Prairie Princess" (Paul) – 2:22
 "Chasin' the Sun" (Green) – 2:01
 "When the Bloom Is on the Sage" (Vincent, Wright) – 3:35
 "Singing a Song to the Sky" (Green) – 2:27
 "On the Rhythm Range" – 2:22
 "Red River Valley" (Traditional) – 4:03
 "When Payday Rolls Around" (Nolan) – 1:47

Personnel
Douglas B. Green (a.k.a. Ranger Doug) – guitar, vocals
Paul Chrisman (a.k.a. Woody Paul) – fiddle, vocals
Fred LaBour (a.k.a. Too Slim) – bass, vocals

External links
Riders in the Sky Official Website

1989 greatest hits albums
Riders in the Sky (band) compilation albums
Rounder Records compilation albums